Bailey Antrobus (born 18 February 2000) is a Wales international rugby league footballer who plays as a  and  for the York Knights in the Betfred Championship.

Background
Antrobus was born in Wollongong, New South Wales, Australia. He is of Welsh descent.

Playing career

Club career
Antrobus played for the St George Illawarra Dragons in  trial games in 2021.

International career
He made his debut in June 2022 against France at the Stadium Municipal d'Albi in Albi.
In 2022 Antrobus was named in the Wales squad for the 2021 Rugby League World Cup. Antrobus played in all three group stage games as Wales were eliminated after losing all their matches.

References

External links
Wales profile
Wales RL profile

2000 births
Living people
Australian rugby league players
Australian people of Welsh descent
Wales national rugby league team players
Rugby league centres
Rugby league players from Wollongong
York City Knights players